DeMarcco Hellams (born June 5, 2000) is an American football safety for the Alabama Crimson Tide.

Early years
Hellams attended DeMatha Catholic High School in Hyattsville, Maryland. He played defensive back and wide receiver in high school. As a senior, he was the Washington Post Metro Offensive Player of the Year after catching 78 passes for 1,469 yards and 21 touchdowns on offense and 12 interceptions on defense. Hellams committed to the University of Alabama to play college football.

College career
Hellams played in 13 games as a true freshman in 2019, recording four tackles and 0.5 sacks. In 13 games his sophomore year in 2020, he had 56 tackles and one sack. As a first-year starter in 2021, Hellams had 87 tackles and three interceptions. He returned to Alabama for his senior year in 2022.

References

External links
Alabama Crimson Tide bio

Living people
American football safeties
Alabama Crimson Tide football players
2000 births
Players of American football from Washington, D.C.